Mikhail Isaievich Tanich (Tankhilevich) (September 15, 1923 – April 17, 2008) was a popular Russian song lyrics writer, a laureate of the Interior Ministry Award (1997), a laureate of the jubilee contest The Song of the Year devoted to the 25th anniversary of that television program, a laureate of nearly all the annual festivals The Song of the Year, and a laureate of the Ovation National Music Award (1997).

Biography
Mikhail Isaevich Tankhilevich was born in Taganrog. He graduated from the Rostov Civil Engineering College (Rostov-on-Don, Russia). He was in the Army during World War II, participated at the Battle of Berlin and was awarded with an Order of Glory of 3rd degree. In 1947, he was arrested on the grounds of false accusations, and spent time in prison until 1953.

After the war Tanich lived in Moscow and worked on the radio and in the press. His first book of collected poems was published in 1959. He then went on to write a  total of fifteen books.

In the beginning of the 1960s he wrote a song The Textile Town, written in collaboration with the Soviet composer Yan Frenkel, became a hit. It was sung by a number of popular singers including Raisa Nemetova and Maya Kristalinskaya.

He has also  co-authored with many  Soviet composers such as Yuri Saulsky, Arkady Ostrovsky, Vadim Gamaliya, Oscar Feltsman, Nikita Bogoslovsky, Vladimir Shainsky. Other composers Tanich has worked with include Igor Nikolayev, Arkady Ukupnik and Vyacheslav Malezhik.

Along with Sergey Korzhukov who died in 1994, Mikhail Tanich cofounded the group Lesopoval.

Family
Spouse – lyrics writer Lydia Kozlova
Children – Inga Kozlova, Svetlana Kozlova

Achievements and awards
Laureate of the Interior Ministry Award (1997)
Laureate of the Ovation National Music Award (1997)
Order of the Red Star
Order or Honour (1998)
Order of the Patriotic War (1985)
Order of Glory (1945)
People's Artist of Russia (2003)
Honored Professor at the Rostov State Civil Engineering College

References

External links
 
 

1923 births
2008 deaths
Burials at Vagankovo Cemetery
Russian Jews
Russian male poets
Writers from Taganrog
Jewish songwriters
Recipients of the Order of Glory
Soviet military personnel of World War II